Mikel Aranburu Eizagirre (born 18 February 1979) is a Spanish retired professional footballer who played as a midfielder.

He spent his entire professional career with Real Sociedad, appearing in 427 official matches for the club and scoring 32 goals.

Club career
Born in Azpeitia, Gipuzkoa, Aranburu made his professional debut aged 18, in the last round of 1996–97 against CD Logroñés, courtesy of manager Javier Irureta. From his fourth season onwards he became a full member of the main squad, being essential as the Basques finished second in La Liga in 2002–03 by contributing with 34 games and two goals.

Aranburu was seriously injured during 2005–06, and returned to major action only to see Real be relegated the following year, the first time in four decades. He continued to be an important first-team member during the second division campaigns, appearing in 35 matches in 2009–10 to help the Txuriurdin return to the top level after three years.

In the promotion season, Mikel Aranburu was once again the regular starter to return the team to the First Division, playing 35 games and scoring 2 goals. In 2010–11, Aranburu was once again first-choice, partnering Diego Rivas in central defensive midfield in most of the games. He equalled a career-best five goals, including two in a 4–0 away win against Getafe CF – he only played five minutes in the game– and the all-important last-minute winner at home against Real Zaragoza in the 36th round (2–1), as the side narrowly retained their division status.

International career
He has played several international friendly matches with the Euskadi Soccer Team and has even served as captain of that team.

Honours
Segunda División: 2009–10

See also
List of one-club men in association football
 List of Real Sociedad players

References

External links

1979 births
Living people
People from Azpeitia
Spanish footballers
Footballers from the Basque Country (autonomous community)
Association football midfielders
La Liga players
Segunda División players
Segunda División B players
Tercera División players
Real Sociedad B footballers
Real Sociedad footballers
Basque Country international footballers